Miguel Becerra González (born 11 March 1979 in Etzatlán, Jalisco) is a Mexican former football goalkeeper who last played for Santos Laguna.

Playing career
Miguel Becerra debuted with Chivas de Guadalajara taking over the absence of Oswaldo Sánchez who went with the World cup Squad who played in Korea/Japan 2002. He was transfer to Dorados de Sinaloa and played seven games there until leaving for Querétaro F.C. in which he was the starting goalkeeper for a period of time. He left Querétaro when the team was relegated back to Primera Division A, and transferred to Santos Laguna and was reunited with an old goalkeeping friend Oswaldo Sánchez. When things seemed like if Becerra would not play with Santos, Oswaldo was injured and Miguel played the rest of the tournament and played well, and gained the nickname of "El Gordo" from many commentators. With Becerra Santos reached the Semifinals only to lose to Pumas UNAM by a small margin aggregate 5–4.

Honors

Santos Laguna
Primera División (1): Clausura 2012

External links

1979 births
Living people
Footballers from Jalisco
C.D. Guadalajara footballers
Dorados de Sinaloa footballers
Querétaro F.C. footballers
Santos Laguna footballers
Liga MX players
Association football goalkeepers
Mexican footballers